Keilhau Glacier is a glacier  long 
flowing west from Kohl Plateau and then southwest to Jossac Bight, on the south coast of South Georgia. It was mapped by Olaf Holtedahl during his visit to South Georgia in 1927–28, and named by him for Baltazar M. Keilhau, a Norwegian geologist and professor of mineralogy at the University of Christiania.

See also
 List of glaciers in the Antarctic
 Glaciology

References

Glaciers of South Georgia